The Netherlands participated in the Junior Eurovision Song Contest 2018 which took place in Minsk, Belarus on 25 November 2018. The Dutch broadcaster AVROTROS was responsible for the organisation of their representative at the contest. Their entry was selected through the national selection Junior Songfestival 2018, which had four songs.

Background

Prior to the 2018 Contest, the Netherlands had participated in the Junior Eurovision Song Contest fifteen times since its first entry in 2003. The Netherlands have won the contest on one occasion: in 2009 with the song "Click Clack" performed by Ralf Mackenbach. In 2017, the Netherlands placed 4th out of 16 entries with the song "Love Me" performed by the boy band Fource.

Before Junior Eurovision

Junior Songfestival 2018

Competing entries

The artists were credited without their surnames.

Final

The final was held on 29 September 2018, hosted by Romy Monteiro.

Artist and song information

Max & Anne
Max & Anne were a pop duo consisting of child singers Maxime Albertazzi and Anne Buhre. The duo was active between 2018 and 2019. They represented the Netherlands in the Junior Eurovision Song Contest 2018 with the song "Samen".

Albertazzi was born on 17 August 2004 in Houten. In July 2020, she came out as transgender. Buhre was born on 31 March 2004 in Voorschoten.

Samen
"Samen" is a song by Dutch singers Maxime Albertazzi and Anne Buhre. It represented the Netherlands in the Junior Eurovision Song Contest 2018. Maxime and Anne performed on the big stage and their dancers Idaila Voorn and Marc Vermeulen performed on the extra stage. They finished thirteenth with 91 points (23 points from national juries and 68 points from the online voting).

At Junior Eurovision
During the opening ceremony and the running order draw which both took place on 19 November 2018, Netherlands was drawn to perform sixth on 25 November 2018, following Russia and preceding Azerbaijan.

Voting

Detailed voting results

References 

Junior Eurovision Song Contest
Netherlands
2018